Nicole Berger (born Nicole Gouspeyre, 12 June 1934 – 13 April 1967) was a French actress.

Biography
Berger was born in Paris.  She had a brief theatrical career, particularly in the Compagnie Barrault-Renaud, before starting to film.  Claude Autant-Lara gave her her first real chance in 1954, giving her one of the three leading roles in Le Blé en herbe.  She went on to perform on film from 1956 to 1963, then had a gap for two years during which she only performed in one full-length film. She then turned to television, playing the protagonist of the leading soap Cecilia.

She was killed in a car crash in Eure when she was thrown from a car driven by Dany Dauberson.

Partial filmography 

1952: Jocelyn (by Jacques de Casembroot) - Julie, la soeur de Jocelyn
1953: Julietta (by Marc Allégret) - Martine Valendor
1954: Le Blé en herbe (by Claude Autant-Lara) - Vinca
1955: Spring, Autumn and Love (by Gilles Grangier) - Cécilia
1956: The Girl from Flanders (by Helmut Käutner) - Angeline Meunier / Engele
1956: Les Indiscrètes (by Raoul André) - Elisabeth Langeac
1956: Les Aventures de Till L'Espiègle (by Joris Ivens and Gérard Philipe) - Nèle
1957: He Who Must Die (by Jules Dassin) - Mariori
1957: Spring of Life (by Arne Mattsson) - Elisa Fernandez
1958: First of May (Le Père et l'Enfant) (by Luis Saslavsky) - Annie Chapois
1958: Girls of the Night (by Maurice Cloche) - Néda
1958: En cas de malheur (by Claude Autant-Lara) - Janine - la bonne d'Yvette
1958: Véronique et son cancre (Short, by Eric Rohmer) - Véronique
1959: Les Dragueurs (by Jean-Pierre Mocky) - Françoise
1959: All the Boys Are Called Patrick (Short, by Jean-Luc Godard) - Véronique
1959: The Restless and the Damned (by Yves Allégret) - Claire Rancourt
1960: The Siege of Sidney Street (The Siege of Hell Street) (by Robert S. Baker and Monty Berman) - Sara
1960: Tirez sur le pianiste (by François Truffaut) - Thérèse Saroyan
1961: The Seven Deadly Sins (by various directors) - (segment "Luxure, La") (uncredited)
1962: La Dénonciation (by Jacques Doniol-Valcroze) - Eléonore Germain
1963: La Machine à parler d'amour (Short, by Sébastien Japrisot) - La jeune fille
1963: Chair de poule (by Julien Duvivier) - Simone
1963: À propos d'un meurtre (Short, by Christian Ledieu)
1964: Douchka (Short, by Marco de Gastyne) - Récitante / Narrator (voice)
1965: Mademoiselle de la Ferte (TV Movie, called "drama" at the time, soap) - Diana
1966: Cécilia, médecin de campagne (TV Series) - Cécilia Beaudouin
1968: The Story of a Three-Day Pass (by Melvin Van Peebles) - Miriam (final film role)

Theatre 
 1959 : La Folie by and directed by Louis Ducreux, Théâtre de la Madeleine

References

External links

1934 births
1967 deaths
French stage actresses
French film actresses
French television actresses
Actresses from Paris
Burials at Père Lachaise Cemetery
20th-century French actresses
Road incident deaths in France